Jonathan J. "J. J." Woodman (May 24, 1825July 3, 1907) was the Speaker of the Michigan House of Representatives from 1869 to 1872.

Early life 
Woodman was born on May 24, 1825, in Sutton, Vermont.

Career 
Woodman was sworn in as a member of the Michigan House of Representatives from the Van Buren County district on January 2, 1861, and served until 1862. Woodman was then sworn in on January 6, 1863, to represent the Van Buren County 1st district until 1872. From 1869 to 1872, Woodman concurrently served as the Speaker of the Michigan House of Representatives. Woodman was a delegate to the Republican National Convention from Michigan in 1876.

Personal life 
Woodman married Harty H. Hunt, and together they had one child. Later, Woodman would marry Olivia J. Carpenter. Woodman was a member of the Grange.

Death 
Woodman died on July 3, 1907, in Van Buren County, Michigan. Woodman is interred at Prospect Hill Cemetery in Paw Paw, Michigan.

References 

1825 births
1907 deaths
Speakers of the Michigan House of Representatives
Republican Party members of the Michigan House of Representatives
Burials in Michigan
19th-century American politicians